The Trinity Range is a mountain range in Pershing County, Nevada.

Ragged Top Mountain is located in the Trinity Range.

References 

Mountain ranges of Nevada
Mountain ranges of Pershing County, Nevada